Andenæs is a Norwegian surname that may refer to
Ellen Holager Andenæs (born 1947), Norwegian jurist
Henrik Andenæs (born 1950), Norwegian businessman
Johannes Andenæs (1912–2003), Norwegian jurist
June Andenæs  (born 9 June 1983), retired Norwegian handball player
Mads Andenæs (born 1957), legal academic
Mads H. Andenæs (born 1940), Norwegian legal academic, husband of Ellen and son of Johannes 
Ragnhild Andenæs (born 1977), Norwegian fencer
Tønnes Andenæs (1855–1942), Norwegian jurist, book publisher and politician

Norwegian-language surnames